Red Heat is a 1985 women in prison film starring Linda Blair and Sylvia Kristel.

Plot summary
Christine Carlson (Linda Blair), an American college student, travels to West Germany to visit her fiancé Mike (William Ostrander), who is serving in the US Army there.  She tries to convince him to marry her promptly, but he chooses to delay marriage in order to re-enlist.  Distraught by Mike's decision, Christine takes a late-night walk where she witnesses a kidnapping by the East German Stasi and gets kidnapped herself as well.  She is transported to East Germany, where she is brutally interrogated by the Stasi, forced to admit to false charges of espionage, and thrown into a women's prison with the common criminals, including the gang leader Sofia (Sylvia Kristel), who is the prisoners' "top bitch" and has de facto control of the entire prison population.  Sofia takes pleasure in brutally tormenting and harassing Christine, until the latter loses her patience and fights Sofia in a no-holds-barred brawl.  Meanwhile, Mike is determined to free his beloved, and tries to get the US Army and the West German BND to help him.  At first they refuse, but ultimately they reluctantly go along with his plans and help him free Christine.

Cast
 Linda Blair as Christine Carlson
 Sylvia Kristel as Sofia 
 Sue Kiel as Hedda 
 William Ostrander as Mike 
 Elisabeth Volkmann as Einbeck 
 Albert Fortell as Ernst 
 Herb Andress as Werner 
 Barbara Spitz as Meg 
 Kati Marothy as Barbara 
 Dagmar Schwarz as Lillian 
 Sissy Weiner as Uta 
 Norbert Blecha as Kurt 
 Sonja Martin as Evelyn 
 Evelyn Engleder as Eva 
 John Brett as Roger
 Michael Troy as Howard 
 Helmut Janatsch as Lecture 
 Elvira Neustädtl as Limmer 
 Fritz von Friedl as BND Agent

References

External links

1985 films
Women in prison films
Cold War films
Films set in Germany
Films directed by Robert Collector
Films scored by Tangerine Dream
Films set in prison
Films set in East Germany
Films set in West Germany
Films about the United States Army
1980s English-language films